
This is a list of aircraft in alphabetical order beginning with 'S'.

Sv

SVAM 
(Shanghai Vantage Airship Manufacture Co.)
 SVAM CA-80

SV
(SV Aircraft Pty. Ltd.)
 SV-11B Farmate

Svenska Aero
 Svenska Aero SV-10 Pirat
 Svenska Aero SV-12 Falk
 Svenska Aero SA-10 Pirat
 Svenska Aero SA-11 Jaktfalken – ("Fighter Falcon")
 Svenska Aero SA-12 Skolfalken – ("Trainer Falcon")
 Svenska Aero SA-13 Övningsfalken – ("Advanced Trainer Falcon")
 Svenska Aero SA-14 Jaktfalken I
 Svenska Aero SA-14 Jaktfalken II
 Svenska Aero SA-14E Jaktfalken II
 Svenska Aero SA-15
 Svenska Aero J5
 Svenska Aero J6
 Svenska Aero J6A
 Svenska Aero J6B
 Svenska Aero Ö 7
 Svenska Aero Ö 8
 Svenska Aero Sk 8
 Svenska Aero S 8

supplied by Svenska Aero or built under licence
 Heinkel HE 1
 Svenska S.I
 Svenska S 2
 Heinkel S.II
 Heinkel S.IIa
 Heinkel J 4
 Heinkel S 2
 Heinkel S 3
 Heinkel S 4
 Heinkel S 5
 Heinkel Sk 4
 Heinkel Sk 5

Svenska Flygfabriken
(Svenska Flygfabriken / Lage Norberg)
Svenska Flygfabriken LN-3 Seagull

References

Further reading

External links

 List Of Aircraft (S)

de:Liste von Flugzeugtypen/N–S
fr:Liste des aéronefs (N-S)
nl:Lijst van vliegtuigtypes (N-S)
pt:Anexo:Lista de aviões (N-S)
ru:Список самолётов (N-S)
sv:Lista över flygplan/N-S
vi:Danh sách máy bay (N-S)